The  is an electric multiple unit (EMU) train type operated in Japan by the private railway operator Hankyu Railway since 1975.

Operations
The 4-car 6300 series trains operate on the Hankyū Arashiyama Line.

Formations

8-car sets

, a total of 24 vehicles are in operation, formed as two 6-car sets and three 4-car sets.

4-car sets
The three 4-car sets, numbered 6351 to 6363, are formed as follows, with two motored (M) cars and two unpowered trailer (T) cars.

The "M" cars are fitted with two scissors-type pantographs.

6-car sets
The two 6-car sets, numbered 6350 and 6354 (Kyō-Train), are formed as follows, with four motored (M) cars and two unpowered trailer (T) cars.

The two "M" cars are each fitted with two scissors-type pantographs.

History
The Hankyu 6300 series were originally built for limited express services on the Hankyū Kyōto Main Line starting in 1975 and refurbished for Arashiyama Line services from 2009.

The Hankyu 6300 series was awarded the 1976 Blue Ribbon Award of the Japan Railfan Club.

References

Electric multiple units of Japan
6300 series
Train-related introductions in 1975
Alna Koki rolling stock
1500 V DC multiple units of Japan